Marion Township is the name of some places in the U.S. state of Michigan:

 Marion Township, Charlevoix County, Michigan
 Marion Township, Livingston County, Michigan
 Marion Township, Osceola County, Michigan
 Marion Township, Saginaw County, Michigan
 Marion Township, Sanilac County, Michigan

See also 
 Marion, Michigan, a village in Osceola County
 Marion Township (disambiguation)

Michigan township disambiguation pages